Mount Addenbroke is a mountain on East Redonda Island, British Columbia, Canada, located  northwest of Mount Crawshay and  southeast of Mount Bunsen.

References

One-thousanders of British Columbia
Discovery Islands
Pacific Ranges
New Westminster Land District